Tina Mayolo Pic (born May 9, 1966) is an American bicycle racer. She is a 6-time United States National Criterium Championships winner (2002–2005, 2007, 2009) and a 4-time USA Cycling National Racing Calendar points champion (2000, 2004–2006).

Career
Pic graduated from the University of Virginia with degrees in Finance and Marketing. She subsequently enrolled in a pre-medical programme at the University of Georgia, where she switched sports from triathlon and duathlon to cycling, winning the Collegiate National Championship in 1995 and turning professional the following year. Pic announced her retirement at the end of 2009 season, remaining with the Colavita team for 2010 as a director alongside team-mate Rachel Heal, replacing Iona Wynter. After the original Colavita team dissolved in October 2011, Pic joined the refounded Colavita-espnW team for 2012 as a director alongside Wynter. She subsequently made a comeback to racing for the team during the summer of 2012. For the 2014 season, she was the on-road directeur sportif of DNA Cycling p/b K4.

Major results

1998
 Superweek
1st July 17
1st July 21
3rd July 23
 1st Tour de Moore
 3rd Tour of Somerville
 3rd 89er Criterium
 Tour LeFleur
3rd Road race
6th Criterium
 5th Time trial, National Road Championships
 5th Wilmington Classic
 5th Athens Twilight Criterium
 6th Overall Fitchburg Longsjo Classic
 6th Graton Road Race, Wine Country Classic
 7th Overall Enchanted Mountain Stage Race
 9th Overall Sea Otter Classic
1999
 4th Tour of Somerville
 National Road Championships
5th Time trial
6th Criterium
7th Road race
 5th Overall Tour of the Gila
 5th Clarendon Cup
 6th LeFleur Criterium
 8th Athens Twilight Criterium
2000
 1st Overall USA Cycling National Racing Calendar
 1st NYC Women's Challenge
 1st Tour of Somerville
 2nd BMC Tour of San Jose
 2nd BMC Software Criterium (Houston)
 3rd Overall Parker Dam Road Race
1st La Paz County Park Criterium
 Sequoia Cycling Classic
3rd Rocky Hill Road Race
4th Visalia Criterium
 3rd Merced Downtown Criterium, McLane-Pacific Bicycle Classic
 National Road Championships
4th Criterium
6th Time trial
8th Road race
 4th Overall International Tour de Toona
 4th Overall Tour of Willamette
 4th Overall Sea Otter Classic
 5th Chris Thater Memorial Criterium
 5th Capitol Cup Criterium
 7th Liberty Classic
 7th Clarendon Cup
 10th Overall Tour of the Gila
1st Stage 4 (Silver City Criterium)
2001
 1st Manhattan Beach Grand Prix
 2nd Overall Wendy's International Cycling Classic
 2nd Overall Valley of the Sun Stage Race
1st Stage 3 (Mercury Criterium)
 2nd Chris Thater Memorial Criterium
 2nd Tour of Somerville
 National Road Championships
4th Criterium
7th Time trial
9th Road race
 4th Xcelerate Twilight Criterium
 5th Capital Cup
 Sequoia Cycling Classic
5th Rocky Hill Road Race
8th Visalia Criterium
 7th Timex International Women's Open
 8th San Rafael Cycling Classic
 8th BMC Software Criterium (Austin)
2002
 National Road Championships
1st  Criterium
3rd Road race
3rd Time trial
 8th Liberty Classic
2003
 1st  National Criterium Championships
 1st Housatonic Classic Criterium
 9th Liberty Classic
2004
 National Road Championships
1st  Criterium
3rd Road race
 1st Overall USA Cycling National Racing Calendar
 McLane Pacific Classic
1st Road race
1st Criterium
 2nd San Fran T-Mobile International
 4th Overall Sea Otter Classic
 5th Overall Tour du Grand Montréal
1st Stage 1 (ITT)
 8th Overall Redlands Bicycle Classic
1st Stage 4
2005
 1st  Road race, Pan American Road Championships
 National Road Championships
1st  Criterium
3rd Road race
 1st Overall USA Cycling National Racing Calendar
 1st Stage 7 International Tour de Toona
 1st Stage 1 Women's Tour of New Zealand
 6th Overall Redlands Bicycle Classic
2006
 1st Overall USA Cycling National Racing Calendar
 1st Clarendon Cup
 1st Garret Lemire Criterium
 1st Sunny King Criterium
 1st Bikejam
 1st Tour of Somerville
 1st CapTech Classic
 1st Presbyterian Hospital Invitational Criterium
 1st Stage 2 Redlands Bicycle Classic
 3rd Overall International Tour de Toona
 3rd Liberty Classic
 4th Australia World Cup
2007
 1st  Road race, Pan American Road and Track Championships
 1st  National Criterium Championships
 1st U.S. Open Cycling Championships
 1st Tour de Leelanau
 1st Presbyterian Hospital Invitational Criterium
 Central Valley Classic
1st Criterium
1st Road race
 1st Richmond Cycling Classic
 1st Overall United States Criterium Southeast Series
1st Roswell Race
1st Walterboro Race
1st Greenwood
 1st Hanes Park Criterium
 7th Overall Tour of Geelong
1st Stage 4
 9th Liberty Classic
2008
 1st Overall USA Cycling National Racing Calendar
 1st Overall US SpeedWeek Criterium Series
 1st Beaufort Memorial Cycling Classic
 1st Uptown Greenwood Pro Cycling Challenge
 1st Steadman Hawkins Cycling Classic
 1st Sunny King Criterium
 1st Historic Nalley Roswell Criterium
 1st Sandy Springs Cycling Challenge
 1st Tour of Somerville
 Fitchburg Longsjo Classic
1st Criterium
3rd Road race
 1st Chris Thater Memorial
 1st Priority Health Grand Cycling Classic
 1st Stage 1 Mt. Hood Cycling Classic
 1st Stage 2 Nature Valley Grand Prix
 2nd Road race, National Road Championships
 2nd AT&T Austin Downtown Criterium
 2nd Hanes Park Classic
 3rd Presbyterian Hospital Invitational Criterium
 6th Liberty Classic
 9th Road race, Pan American Road and Track Championships
2009
 1st  National Criterium Championships
 1st Tour of Somerville
 1st Marion Classic
 2nd Sunny King Criterium
 2nd RFK Criterium
 2nd Presbyterian Hospital Invitational Criterium
 3rd Chris Thater Memorial
 5th San Jose Cycling Classic
 5th Hanes Park Classic
2012
 4th Exergy Twilight Criterium
2013
 5th Sunny King Criterium
 6th Delray Beach Criterium
2014
 1st Overall Armed Forces Association Cycling Classic
1st Stages 1 & 2
 1st Athens Twilight Criterium
 1st Historic Roswell Criterium
 1st Downtown Walterboro Criterium
 1st Wilmington Grand Prix
 2nd Manhattan Beach Grand Prix
 4th Gaffney Criterium
 5th Tour of Somerville
 6th Charlotte-Belmont Omnium
 7th Andersen Banducci Twilight Criterium
 8th Spartanburg Regional Classic
2015
 1st Overall Tour of America's Dairyland
1st Stages 1, 3, 4, 7 & 8
 1st Athens Twilight Criterium
 1st Wilmington Grand Prix
 2nd National Criterium Championships
2016
 7th White Spot / Delta Road Race

References

External links
Quark Cycling Gear
Bio on USA Cycling

1966 births
Living people
American female cyclists
Sportspeople from Santa Fe, New Mexico
21st-century American women
Cyclists from New Mexico
Cyclists from Virginia
Sportspeople from Alexandria, Virginia